Cotys III or Kotys III (Tiberios Iulios Kotys Philocaesar Philoromaios Eusebes, flourished second half of 2nd century and first half of 3rd century – died 234) was a Roman client king of the Bosporan Kingdom. Like many of the other late Bosporan kings, Cotys III is known mainly from coinage, meaning that the historical events of his reign are largely unknown. His coins are known from the period 228–234. He is known from an inscription to have been the son of his predecessor, Rhescuporis III.

Cotys III's coinage overlaps with the coins of Sauromates III, perhaps his brother, and Rhescuporis IV. They might thus have been co-rulers with him. His relationship to later kings is unknown, though it has been suggested that he was the father of Ininthimeus.

See also
 Bosporan Kingdom
 Roman Crimea

References

Monarchs of the Bosporan Kingdom
Roman client rulers
3rd-century monarchs in Europe
Year of birth unknown
Julii
234 deaths